The military occupation of Lithuania by Nazi Germany lasted from the German invasion of the Soviet Union on June 22, 1941 to the end of the Battle of Memel on January 28, 1945. At first the Germans were widely welcomed as liberators from the repressive Soviet regime which occupied Lithuania prior to the German arrival. In hopes of re-establishing independence or regaining some autonomy, Lithuanians organized a Provisional Government. Thousands of Lithuanian nationalists then cooperated with the Generalkommissariat, jointly killing almost 200,000 Jews, which marks the highest death rate proportionally in any country during the Holocaust.

Background

In August 1939, the Soviet Union and Nazi Germany signed the German–Soviet Nonaggression Pact and its Secret Additional Protocol, dividing Central and Eastern Europe into spheres of influence. Lithuania was initially assigned to the German sphere, likely due to its economic dependence on German trade. After the March 1939 ultimatum regarding the Klaipėda Region, Germany accounted for 75% of Lithuanian exports and 86% of its imports. To solidify its influence, Germany suggested a German–Lithuanian military alliance against Poland and promised to return the Vilnius Region, but Lithuania held to its policy of strict neutrality. When Germany invaded Poland in September 1939, the Wehrmacht took control of the Lublin Voivodeship and eastern Warsaw Voivodeship, which were in the Soviet sphere of influence. To compensate the Soviet Union for this loss, a secret codicil to the German–Soviet Boundary and Friendship Treaty transferred Lithuania to the Soviet sphere of influence, which would  serve as the justification that enabled the Soviet Union to occupy Lithuania on June 15, 1940 and to establish the Lithuanian SSR.

Almost immediately after the German–Soviet Boundary and Friendship Treaty, the Soviets pressured the Lithuanians into signing the Soviet–Lithuanian Mutual Assistance Treaty. The territories that Lithuania received from the Soviet Union were the former territories of the Second Polish Republic, disputed between Poland and Lithuania since the times of the Polish-Lithuanian War of 1920 and occupied by the Soviet Union following the Soviet invasion of Poland in September 1939. The Soviet–Lithuanian Treaty was described by The New York Times as "virtual sacrifice of independence." Similar pacts were proposed to Latvia, Estonia, and Finland. Finland was the only state to refuse such a treaty and that sparked the Winter War. This war delayed the occupation of Lithuania: the Soviets did not interfere with Lithuania's domestic affairs and Russian soldiers were well-behaved in their bases. As Winter War ended in March and Germany was making rapid advances in the Battle of France, the Soviets heightened anti-Lithuanian rhetoric and accused Lithuanians of kidnapping Soviet soldiers from their bases. Despite Lithuanian attempts to negotiate and resolve the issues, Soviet Union issued an ultimatum on June 14, 1940. Lithuanians accepted the ultimatum and Soviet military took control of major cities by June 15. The following day identical ultimatums were issued to Latvia and Estonia. To legitimize the occupation, the Soviets staged elections to the so-called People's Seimas, which then proclaimed establishment of the Lithuanian Soviet Socialist Republic. This allowed Soviet propaganda to claim that Lithuania voluntarily joined the Soviet Union.

Soon after the occupation started, Sovietization policies were implemented. On July 1, all political, cultural, and religious organizations were closed, with only the Communist Party of Lithuania and its youth branch  allowed to exist. This disruption in management and operations created a sharp drop in production. Russian soldiers and officials were eager to spend their appreciated rubles and caused massive shortages of goods. To turn small peasants against large landowners, collectivization was not introduced in Lithuania. In preparation for eventual collectivization, new taxes between 30% and 50% of farm production were enacted. The Lithuanian litas was artificially depreciated to 3–4 times its actual value and withdrawn by March 1941. Before the elections to the People's Parliament, the Soviets arrested some 2,000 prominent political activists. These arrests paralyzed any attempts to create anti-Soviet groups. An estimated 12,000 were imprisoned as "enemies of the people." When farmers were unable to meet exorbitant new taxes, some 1,100 of the larger farmers were put on trial. On June 14–18, 1941, less than a week before the Nazi invasion, some 17,000 Lithuanians were deported to Siberia, where many perished due to inhumane living conditions (see June deportation). Some of the many political prisoners were massacred by the retreating Red Army. These persecutions were key in soliciting support for the Nazis.

German invasion and Lithuanian revolt 

On June 22, 1941, the territory of the Lithuanian SSR was invaded by two advancing German army groups: Army Group North, which took over western and northern Lithuania, and Army Group Centre, which took over most of the Vilnius Region. The first attacks were carried out by the Luftwaffe against Lithuanian cities and claimed lives of some 4,000 civilians. Most Russian aircraft were destroyed on the ground. Germans rapidly advanced, encountering only sporadic resistance from the Soviets and assistance from the Lithuanians, who viewed them as liberators and hoped that the Germans would re-establish their independence or at least autonomy.

Lithuanians took up arms in an anti-Soviet and pro-Independence revolt. Groups of men organized spontaneously and took control of strategic objects (such as railroads, bridges, communication equipment, warehouses of food and equipment) protecting them from potential Soviet sabotage. Kaunas was taken by the rebels of the Lithuanian Activist Front (LAF). Kazys Škirpa, leader of LAF, had been preparing for the uprising since at least March 1941.  The activists proclaimed Lithuanian independence and established the Provisional Government of Lithuania on June 23. Vilnius was taken by soldiers of the 29th Lithuanian Territorial Corps, former soldiers of the independent Lithuanian Army, who deserted from the Red Army. Smaller, less organized groups emerged in other cities and the countryside.

The Battle of Raseiniai began June 23 as Soviets attempted to mount a counterattack, reinforced by tanks, but were heavily defeated by the 27th. It is estimated that the uprising involved some 16,000–30,000 people and claimed lives of about 600 Lithuanians and 5,000 Soviet activists. On June 24, Germans entered both Kaunas and Vilnius without a fight. 
Within a week, the Germans sustained 3,362 losses, but controlled the entire country.

German occupation

Administration 

During the first days of war, German military administration, chiefly concerned with the region's security, tolerated Lithuanian attempts to establish their own administrative institutions and left a number of civilian issues to the Lithuanians. The Provisional Government in Kaunas attempted to establish the proclaimed independence of Lithuania and undo the damage of the one-year Soviet regime. During six weeks of its existence, the Government issued about 100 laws and decrees, but they were largely not enforced. Its policies can be described as both anti-Soviet and antisemitic. The Government organized volunteer forces, known as the Tautinio Darbo Apsaugos Batalionas (TDA), to serve as basis for the re-established Lithuanian Army, though the battalion was soon employed by the Einsatzkommando 3 and Rollkommando Hamann for mass executions of the Lithuanian Jews in the Ninth Fort. At the time rogue units led by the infamous Algirdas Klimaitis rampaged through the city and the outskirts.

The Germans did not recognize the Lithuanian government, and at the end of July formed their own civil administration – which formed part of the Reichskommissariat Ostland, which was divided into four Generalbezirke (General Districts). Adrian von Renteln became the Generalkommisssar of Generalbezirk Litauen and took over all government functions in Lithuania. The Provisional Government resigned on August 5; some of its ministers became General Advisers in charge of local self-government. The Germans did not have enough manpower to staff local administration; therefore, most local offices were headed by the Lithuanians. Policy decisions would be made by high-ranking Germans and actually implemented by low-ranking Lithuanians. The General Advisers were mostly a rubber stamp institution that the Germans used to blame for unpopular decisions. Three of the advisers resigned within months, other four were deported to the Stutthof concentration camp when they protested several German policies. Overall, local self-government was quite developed in Lithuania and helped to sabotage or hinder several German initiatives, including raising a Waffen-SS unit or providing men for forced labor in Germany.

The Holocaust 

Before the Holocaust, Lithuania was home to about 210,000 or 250,000 Jews and was one of the greatest centers of Jewish theology, philosophy, and learning which preceded even the times of the Gaon of Vilna. The Holocaust in Lithuania can be divided into three stages: mass executions (June–December 1941), ghetto period (1942 – March 1943), and final liquidation (April 1943 – July 1944).

Unlike in other Nazi-occupied countries where the Holocaust was introduced gradually (first limiting Jewish civil rights, then concentrating Jews in ghettos, and only then executing them in death camps), executions in Lithuania started on the first days of war. Einsatzkommando A entered Lithuania one day behind the Wehrmacht invasion to encourage self-cleansing. According to German documents, on June 25–26, 1941, "about 1,500 Jews were eliminated by Lithuanian partisans. Many Jewish synagogues were set on fire; on the following nights another 2,300 were killed." The killings provided justification for rounding up Jews and putting them in ghettos to "protect them", where by December 1941 in Kaunas, 15,000 remained, 22,000 having been executed. The executions were carried out at three main groups: in Kaunas (Ninth Fort), in Vilnius (Ponary massacre), and in countryside (Rollkommando Hamann). In Lithuania, by 1 December 1941, over 120,000 Lithuanian Jews had been killed. It is estimated that 80% of the Lithuanian Jews were killed before 1942, many by or with the active participation of Lithuanians in units, such as Police Battalions.

The surviving 43,000 Jews were concentrated in the Vilnius, Kaunas, Šiauliai, and Švenčionys Ghettos and forced to work for the benefit of German military industry. On June 21, 1943, Heinrich Himmler issued an order to liquidate all ghettos and transfer the remaining Jews to concentration camps. Vilnius Ghetto was liquidated, while Kaunas and Šiauliai were turned into concentration camps and survived until July 1944. Remaining Jews were sent to camps in Stutthof, Dachau, Auschwitz. Only about 2,000–3,000 of Lithuanian Jews were liberated from these camps. More survived by withdrawing into Russia's interior before the war broke out or by escaping the ghettos and joining the Jewish partisans.

The genocide rate of Jews in Lithuania, up to 95–97%, was the highest in Europe. This was primarily due, with few notable exceptions, to widespread Lithuanian cooperation with the German authorities. Jews were widely blamed for the previous Soviet regime (see Jewish Bolshevism) and were resented for welcoming Soviet troops. Targeted Nazi propaganda exploited the anti-Soviet sentiment and increased already existing, traditional anti-Semitism.

Collaboration

Lithuanians formed several units that actively assisted Germans:
 Lithuanian Auxiliary Police Battalions – 26 battalions with 12,000–13,000 men
 Lithuanian Construction Battalions – 5 battalions with 2,500 men
 Lithuanian Territorial Defense Force – 10,000–12,000 men
 Self-Defence units – 3,000 men
 Homeland Protection Detachment – 6,000 men

10 of the Lithuanian police battalions, working with the Nazi Einsatzkommando, were involved in mass killings, and are thought to have executed 78,000 individuals.

Many members of the Lithuanian construction units were asked to join the Waffen-SS, of whom up to 40% eventually did, although no Lithuanian national unit was ever formed under the Waffen-SS, and all volunteers served on an individual basis.

Resistance

The majority of anti-Nazi resistance in Lithuania came from the Polish partisans and the Soviet partisans. Both began sabotage and guerrilla operations against German forces immediately after the Nazi invasion of 1941.  The most important Polish resistance organization in Lithuania was, as elsewhere in occupied Poland, the Home Army (Armia Krajowa). Polish commander of the Wilno (Vilnius) region was Aleksander Krzyżanowski.

The activities of Soviet partisans in Lithuania were partly coordinated by the Command of the Lithuanian Partisan Movement headed by Antanas Sniečkus and partly by the Central Command of the Partisan Movement of the USSR.

Jewish partisans in Lithuania also fought against the Nazi occupation. In September 1943, the United Partisan Organization, led by Abba Kovner, attempted to start an uprising in the Vilna Ghetto, and later engaged in sabotage and guerrilla operations against the Nazi occupation. In July 1944, as part of its Operation Tempest, the Polish Home Army launched the Operation Ostra Brama in an attempt to recapture that city. See also Polish–Lithuanian relations during World War II. Lithuania continued in exile, based on the embassies in U.S. and UK.

There was no significant violent resistance directed against the Nazis originating from the Lithuanian society.  In 1943, several underground political groups united under the Supreme Committee for the Liberation of Lithuania (Vyriausias Lietuvos išlaisvinimo komitetas or VLIK). It became mostly active outside of Lithuania among emigrants and deportees, and was able to establish contacts in Western countries and get support for resistance operations inside Lithuania (see Operation Jungle). It would persist abroad for many years as one of the groups representing Lithuania in exile.

In 1943, the Nazis attempted to raise a Waffen-SS division from the local population as they had in many other countries, but due to widespread coordination between resistance groups, the mobilization was boycotted. The Lithuanian Territorial Defense Force (Lietuvos vietinė rinktinė) was eventually formed in 1944 under Lithuanian command, but was disbanded by the Nazis only a few months later for refusing to subordinate to their command. In particular, the relations between Lithuanians and the Poles were poor. Pre-war tensions over the Vilnius Region resulted in a low-level civil war between Poles and Lithuanians. Nazi-sponsored Lithuanian units, primarily the Lithuanian Secret Police, were active in the region and assisted the Germans in repressing the Polish population. In autumn 1943, Armia Krajowa started retaliation operations against the Lithuanian units and killed hundreds of mostly Lithuanian policemen and other collaborators during the first half of 1944. The conflict culminated in the massacres of Polish and Lithuanian civilians in June 1944 in the Glitiškės (Glinciszki) and Dubingiai (Dubinki) villages.

Soviet re-occupation, 1944 

The Soviet Union reoccupied Lithuania as part of the Baltic Offensive in 1944, a two-fold military-political operation to rout German forces and "liberate the Soviet Baltic peoples" beginning in summer 1944.

Demographic losses 
Lithuania suffered significant losses during World War II and the first post-war decade. Historians attempted to quantify population losses and changes, but their task is complicated by the lack of precise and reliable data. There were no censuses between the 1923 census in Lithuania, when Lithuania had 2,028,971 residents, and the Soviet census of 1959, when Lithuania had 2,711,400 residents. Various authors, while providing different breakdowns, generally agree that the population losses between 1940 and 1953 were more than one million people or a third of the pre-war population. This number has three largest components: victims of the Holocaust, victims of Soviet repressions, and refugees or repatriates.

References
Notes

Bibliography

Generalbezirk Litauen
German military occupations
Germany–Lithuania military relations
Germany–Soviet Union relations
Jewish Lithuanian history
Military history of Lithuania during World War II
Military history of the Soviet Union
Occupation of the Baltic states
Lithuania